Foca or FOCA may refer to:

Places
 Foča, a town in eastern Bosnia and Herzegovina
 Foča massacres, atrocities perpetrated in the town of Foča during the 1992–1995 Bosnian War
 Foça, a town in Turkey, known as Phocaea in ancient times
 Foça Islands, an island group in the Bay of Izmir, Turkey

Uses as an acronym
 Friends of Civil Affairs
 Federal Office for Civil Aviation (disambiguation)
 Fellowship of Confessing Anglicans
 Fellowship of Christian Artists
 Fellowship of Christian Assemblies
 Font Object Content Architecture, part of MODCA
 Formula One Constructors' Association
 Freedom of Choice Act
 Forces Combattantes Abacunguzi
Fingerprinting Organizations with Collected Archives (Software)

Other uses
 Foca camera, a brand of French-made rangefinder cameras
 An alternative spelling of Phocas, a Byzantine emperor between 602 and 610
 The Spanish and Romanian word for seal

See also
 Focas (disambiguation)